The Cricket, subtitled "Black Music in Evolution", was a magazine created in 1968 by Amiri Baraka (then known as LeRoi Jones), Larry Neal and A. B. Spellman. Baraka has said: "Larry Neal, AB and I realized the historical influence of music on African /Afro American Culture. I saw the magazine as a necessary dispenser of this influence as part of a continuum. And that attention to the culture was a way of drawing attention to the people's needs and struggle." The headquarters was in New York City.

Four issues of The Cricket were published from 1968 to 1969. Contributors included Sonia Sanchez, Don L. Lee, Milford Graves, Oliver Nelson, Sun Ra, Stanley Crouch, Askia Muhammad Touré, Albert Ayler, Willie Kgositsile, Ishmael Reed, and many others.

References

Further reading
 Gennari, John. Blowin' Hot and Cool: Jazz and Its Critics. University of Chicago Press, 2006. p. 287 - 290.
 Funkhouser, Christopher. "LeRoi Jones, Larry Neal, and the Cricket: Jazz and Poets' Black Fire", African American Review, Vol. 37, 2003.
 Komozi Woodard Amiri Baraka Collection, Atlanta-Fulton Public Library System, Auburn Avenue Research Library on African-American Culture and History. Series I: Black Arts Movement, 1961–1998.
 Poet Amiri Baraka on the freedom movement and Black art, The Gainesville Iguana, January 2007.
 Thomas, Lorenzo and Nielsen, Aldon Lynn. Don't Deny My Name: Words and Music and the Black Intellectual Tradition. University of Michigan Press, 2008, p. 131.
 Salaam, Kalamu ya. Djali Dialogue with Amiri Baraka, First in a Series of Conversations with Established and Emerging African-American Writers. The Black Collegian Magazine.
 Smethurst, James. "Pat Your Foot and Turn the Corner: Amiri Baraka, the Black Arts Movement, and the Poetics of a Popular Avant-Garde", African American Review, Vol. 37, 2003.
 Hanson, Michael. "Suppose James Brown read Fanon: the Black Arts Movement, cultural nationalism and the failure of popular musical praxis", Popular Music. Cambridge University Press, 2008, 27:341-365.

External links
Komozi Woodard Amiri Baraka Collection
Poet Amiri Baraka on the freedom movement and Black art
Djali Dialogue with Amiri Baraka, First in a Series of Conversations with Established and Emerging African-American Writers.

African-American magazines
Music magazines published in the United States
Defunct magazines published in the United States
Magazines established in 1968
Magazines disestablished in 1969
Magazines published in New York City